Fredrik Skagen (30 December 1936 – 20 June 2017) was a Norwegian writer.

He was born in Trondheim. He is best known for his crime fiction, but is also the author of some children's books and several radio plays. His first book was published in 1968. His works have been translated into German, Danish, Swedish, Dutch and French.

Skagen has received several awards, including the Norwegian Booksellers' Prize in 1985 and the Glass Key Award in 1996 for best Nordic crime novel.

Works 
Skagen is known for writing books such as Purpurhjertene: Rapporter fra en Vietnamsoldat (Purple Hearts: Reports of a Vietnam Soldier), Voldtatt (Raped), God Natt, Elskede (Good Night, Darling), and Viktor! Viktor!.

References

1936 births
2017 deaths
20th-century Norwegian novelists
21st-century Norwegian novelists
Norwegian crime fiction writers
People from Trondheim
Norwegian children's writers